Helena Elinder (born 31 August 1973) is a Swedish fencer. She competed in the women's individual épée event at the 1996 Summer Olympics.

References

External links
 

1973 births
Living people
Swedish female épée fencers
Olympic fencers of Sweden
Fencers at the 1996 Summer Olympics
Sportspeople from Stockholm